Colacogloea is a genus of fungi belonging to the family Heterogastridiaceae.

The genus has cosmopolitan distribution.

Species

Species:

Colacogloea allantospora 
Colacogloea bispora 
Colacogloea cycloclastica

References

Pucciniomycotina
Basidiomycota genera
Taxa named by Franz Oberwinkler